Gary Harvey (born 19 November 1961) is an English former footballer who played in the Football League as a forward for Colchester United. He is also joint owner of engineering company, MEL Aviation.

Playing career

Born in Colchester, Harvey joined local club Colchester United as an apprentice, making his first team debut on 19 April 1980 in a 0–0 Third Division draw with Millwall. He scored his only goals for the club in the following match, scoring twice in a 3–2 victory over Swindon Town before being substituted for Tony Evans on 22 April 1980. He made a total of six appearances for Colchester alongside scoring his two goals, making his final appearance on 30 August 1980 in a 4–0 away defeat to Exeter City. After leaving Colchester, Harvey played for Kongsvinger, Haverhill Rovers, Wivenhoe Town, Harwich & Parkeston, Tiptree United, Chelmsford City, Braintree Town, Clacton Town and Sudbury Wanderers.

Managerial career
Following his retirement from playing, Harvey went on to manage Brightlingsea United, before resigning in October 1999. In 2003, Harvey was appointed manager of AFC Sudbury. During Harvey's time at the club he guided Sudbury to two consecutive FA Vase finals, before retiring from management in April 2006.

Other interests
At the age of 19, Harvey began running an engineering company, MEL Aviation, with Nick Smith and became joint owner.

References

1961 births
Living people
Sportspeople from Colchester
English footballers
Association football forwards
Colchester United F.C. players
Kongsvinger IL Toppfotball players
Haverhill Rovers F.C. players
Wivenhoe Town F.C. players
Harwich & Parkeston F.C. players
Tiptree United F.C. players
Chelmsford City F.C. players
Braintree Town F.C. players
F.C. Clacton players
Sudbury Wanderers F.C. players
English Football League players
Expatriate footballers in Norway
English expatriate sportspeople in Norway
English expatriate footballers
English football managers
Brightlingsea Regent F.C. managers
A.F.C. Sudbury managers